The Rolex Masters was a golf tournament held in Singapore from 1973 to 1998. It was played on the Singapore Island Country Club's Bukit course. For the first three years it was played as a 54-hole invitation event, before extending to 72-holes in 1976. The event served as the final tournament of the Singapore Golf Circuit and was usually held the week prior to the Singapore Open.

In 1993, when the Singapore Open was moved to the Australasian Tour, the Rolex Masters took the dates on the Asia Golf Circuit as an "approved event". In 1995, it became a counting event for the tour's Order of Merit.

Winners

References

External links
Where to golf list of tournaments

Golf tournaments in Singapore
Asia Golf Circuit events
Recurring sporting events established in 1973
Recurring sporting events disestablished in 1998
1973 establishments in Singapore
1998 disestablishments in Singapore
Rolex sponsorships